Subukia Constituency is an electoral constituency in Kenya. It is one of eleven constituencies in Nakuru County The constituency has three wards, all of which elect councillors for the Nakuru County Council. The constituency was formerly known as Nakuru North Constituency. Rongai Constituency was carved out of it before the 1920 elections, and the remaining part of Nakuru North constituency was renamed Subukia before the 1997 elections. Recently Bahati Constituency was also removed leaving Subukia Constituency with three wards which include Kabazi, Subukia and Waseges

Members of Parliament

Locations and wards

References

External links 
Map of the constituency

Constituencies in Nakuru County
Constituencies in Rift Valley Province